is a former Japanese football player.

Playing career
Harada was born in Kumamoto on October 27, 1982. After graduating from high school, he joined the J1 League club Nagoya Grampus Eight in 2001. Although he played several matches every season from the first season, he did not play in many matches. In 2004, he moved to the J1 club Oita Trinita. He became a regular player and played many matches under manager Han Berger, starting in May 2004. However his opportunity to play decreased in 2005. In June 2005, he moved to the J1 club Kawasaki Frontale. Although he played many in matches as a substitute midfielder until 2006, he did not play much in 2007. In 2009, he moved to the J2 League club Roasso Kumamoto. He became a regular player and played many matches as a defensive midfielder. However his opportunity to play decreased in 2014 and he retired at the end of the 2014 season.

Club statistics

References

External links

1982 births
Living people
Association football people from Kumamoto Prefecture
Japanese footballers
J1 League players
J2 League players
Nagoya Grampus players
Oita Trinita players
Kawasaki Frontale players
Roasso Kumamoto players
Association football midfielders